Lawrence Brakmo is a software engineer in the Kernel group at Facebook. Previously Brakmo was a member of technical staff at Google. Before that he was a researcher and project manager at NTT DoCoMo USA Labs. Earlier he was affiliated with the Western Research Lab of Digital Equipment Corporation/Compaq/Hewlett-Packard. Brakmo received his Ph.D. in Computer Science from The University of Arizona, where he worked on computer systems and computer networks research that included x-Sim and TCP Vegas. His adviser was Larry L. Peterson.

He once biked to Alaska from Idaho.

External links
 Lawrence Brakmo homepage

Year of birth missing (living people)
Living people
University of Arizona alumni
American computer scientists
Digital Equipment Corporation people
Hewlett-Packard people
Google employees